The 1981 Italian Open was a combined men's and women's tennis tournament that was played on outdoor clay courts. For the second time in the history of the tournament the men and women competed in different locations. The men's event was held at the traditional location of Foro Italico in Rome, while the women played in Perugia. It was the 38th edition of the tournament. The men's tournament was part of the 1981 Volvo Grand Prix while the women's tournament was part of the Toyota Series (Category 3). The women's event was played from 4 May through 10 May 1981 while the men's event was organized from 18 May through 24 May 1981. Third-seeded José Luis Clerc won the men's singles title and the accompanying $24,000 first-prize money. The women's singles title was won by first-seeded Chris Evert-Lloyd, her fourth Italian Open title after 1974, 1975 and 1980.

Finals

Men's singles
 José Luis Clerc defeated  Víctor Pecci 6–3, 6–4, 6–0

Women's singles
 Chris Evert-Lloyd defeated  Virginia Ruzici 6–1, 6–2

Men's doubles
 Hans Gildemeister /  Andrés Gómez defeated  Bruce Manson /  Tomáš Šmíd 7–6, 7–6

Women's doubles
 Candy Reynolds /  Paula Smith defeated  Chris Evert-Lloyd /  Virginia Ruzici 7–5, 6–1

References

External links
 International Tennis Federation (ITF) – Men's tournament edition details
 International Tennis Federation (ITF) – Women's tournament edition details
 Women's Tennis Association (WTA) – Women's Singles and Doubles draw

Italian Open
Italian Open
Italian Open (tennis)
Italian Open (tennis)
Italian Open